The Westfrankenbahn (WFB for short) is a RegioNetz of the Deutsche Bahn AG based in Aschaffenburg.

History 
The Westfrankenbahn was founded on January 1, 2006. The company leased the Aschaffenburg–Miltenberg line between Aschaffenburg Süd and Miltenberg, the Miltenberg West–Wertheim line, the Lauda–Wertheim line, the Crailsheim–Königshofen line and the Seckach–Miltenberg line. In addition, the Westfrankenbahn operates passenger trains on the routes Crailsheim–Heilbronn and Lauda–Königshofen. Since December 13, 2015, the Kahl–Schöllkrippen line has also been part of it. While no services have been provided on the Würzburg–Lauda section since December 2018, individual trains have been running between Lauda and Osterburken since then and continue to Heilbronn until December 2019. Annually, the line provides a total of 3.6 million kilometers of rail transport.

In 2016, however, freight traffic only took place on the northern routes. The port in Wertheim is served regularly. Freight trains also run to Obernburg-Elsenfeld, Miltenberg, Kleinheubach and Gamburg.

Lines

Trains 
The West Franconia Railway originally had 32 diesel railcars of the series 628, 10 diesel railcars of the series 642 and the diesel locomotive 218 105 available. Since 2016, 218460 has replaced the 218105-5, which has since been sold to NeSA. In December 2018, the company took over additional series 642 railcars from DB Regio, which were modernized and replaced the last units of the 628 series by December 2019. Today the WFB uses 44 class 642 railcars. On December 1, 2019, the farewell trip for the class 628 took place at the Westfrankenbahn, the remaining vehicles continued to be used in regular traffic until December 13. Some of the class 628.2 multiple units were handed over to Arriva in the Czech Republic in mid-2019, while those of class 628.4 were largely transferred to the Südostbayernbahn to Mühldorf and to the RAB were delivered to Ulm. In April 2022, the two mint turquoise/pastel turquoise/light grey painted VT 628 (Anna and Maria) returned to the Westfrankenbahn's inventory, having previously been used by the RAB.

References

External links 
 Website der Westfrankenbahn

2006 establishments in Germany
Deutsche Bahn
Railway companies of Germany